Clausilia rugosa is a species of air-breathing land snails, a terrestrial pulmonate gastropod mollusc in the family Clausiliidae.

Subspecies
 Clausilia rugosa andusiensis Coutagne, 1886
 Clausilia rugosa belonidea Bourguignat, 1877
 Clausilia rugosa lamalouensis A. Letourneux, 1877
 Clausilia rugosa magdalenica Salvañá, 1887
 Clausilia rugosa parvula A. Férussac, 1807
 Clausilia rugosa penchinati Bourguignat, 1876
 Clausilia rugosa pinii Westerlund, 1878
 Clausilia rugosa provincialis Coutagne, 1886
 Clausilia rugosa reboudii Dupuy, 1851
 Clausilia rugosa rugosa (Draparnaud, 1801)

Distribution 
This species occurs in:
 Czech Republic
 France for Clausilia rugosa reboudii Dupuy, 1851

References

 Bank, R. A.; Neubert, E. (2017). Checklist of the land and freshwater Gastropoda of Europe. Last update: July 16th, 2017
 Kerney, M.P., Cameron, R.A.D. & Jungbluth, J-H. (1983). Die Landschnecken Nord- und Mitteleuropas. Ein Bestimmungsbuch für Biologen und Naturfreunde, 384 pp., 24 plates.

External links
 Draparnaud, J.-P.-R. (1801). Tableau des mollusques terrestres et fluviatiles de la France. Montpellier / Paris (Renaud / Bossange, Masson & Besson). 1-116

rugosa
Gastropods described in 1801